Cheung Ming-man (born 2 September 1956) is a Hong Kong singer and occasional actor, best known for many patriotic songs he sang in the 1980s, all in Mandarin. He became the first Hong Kong singer to sing at the CCTV New Year's Gala, China's most-watched TV event, when he performed his song "My Chinese Heart" at the 1984 event. The song made him an instant superstar nationally.

Filmography
Danger Has Two Faces (1985) as Man
The Swordsman (1990) as Luk Ta Yau
Made in Heaven (1997)

References

1956 births
Living people
Hong Kong Mandopop singers
20th-century Hong Kong male singers
Hong Kong male film actors
Delegates to the 12th National People's Congress from Hong Kong
Members of the Selection Committee of Hong Kong
Members of the Election Committee of Hong Kong, 1998–2000
Members of the Election Committee of Hong Kong, 2000–2005
Members of the Election Committee of Hong Kong, 2007–2012
Recipients of the Bronze Bauhinia Star
Democratic Alliance for the Betterment and Progress of Hong Kong politicians